KONP (1450 AM) is a radio station based in Port Angeles, Washington.  It signed on the air at 6:30 a.m. local time February 3, 1945.

History
Evening Press Inc., a subsidiary of the Port Angeles Evening News Inc., first sought an AM radio license for the city of Port Angeles in 1937. Final FCC approval was delayed nearly eight years due to international reallocation of frequencies, then suspension of all newspaper applications, and finally wartime suspension of all new construction. The station's first radio tower was a locally-cut 180-foot Douglas fir.

For many years, KONP provided Top 40 music. This music programming, which started with the sounds of the big band era and popular artists of the time, progressed well into the 1990s. It was then that KONP changed its on-air moniker to "Newsradio 1450 KONP" and switched to a news and talk format.

KONP has remained locally owned since it first went on the air. It continues to provide Port Angeles and surrounding areas with the most comprehensive local programming. KONP offers local, regional, national and world news, sports, talk, and up to date information about community events. KONP has won numerous awards and recognition for its news and community information coverage. A daily talk show, "The Todd Ortloff Show", features insight, information and opinion on local issues.

Additionally, the station offers a strong line-up of other talk programming including Armstrong and Getty, Dave Ramsey, Coast to Coast AM, Jim Bohannon, John Batchelor and Our American Stories with Lee Habib.

KONP also broadcasts on 101.7 FM (Port Angeles) and 101.3 FM (eastern Clallam County), as well as its longtime 1450 AM spot on the dial.

References

External links

ONP
News and talk radio stations in the United States